Cathilee Deborah "Cat" Zingano (née Albert; born July 1, 1982) is an American mixed martial artist, currently signed to Bellator MMA, competing in the Women's Featherweight division. Zingano also competed for the Ultimate Fighting Championship (UFC), and on April 13, 2013, she became the first woman to win a UFC fight by technical knockout (TKO). At the time of her departure from the UFC, she was No. 7 in the official UFC bantamweight rankings. As of June 28, 2022, she is #4 in the Bellator Women's pound-for-pound Rankings and #1 in the Bellator Women's Featherweight Rankings.

Early life
Zingano began her career in combat sports with wrestling at age 12. She attended Fairview High School in Boulder, Colorado, where she got involved with combat sports after joining the wrestling team. She eventually became part of both the University of the Cumberlands (2001) and MacMurray College women's wrestling teams and became a 4-time All-American and National Champion.

In 2007 Zingano discovered Brazilian jiu-jitsu (BJJ), shortly after she started to compete and won many tournaments including the World Championships (Mundials) in Los Angeles, and the Rio de Janeiro State Championships in Brazil, along with several State titles in Colorado.

In October 2007, after doing a few months of Brazilian Jiu-Jitsu, Zingano competed in her first amateur Mixed Martial Arts fight and instantly knew that MMA was something she wanted to compete in.

Mixed martial arts career

Early career
Zingano made her pro MMA debut on June 13, 2008, at Ring of Fire 32, and submitted Karina Taylor with an armbar in the first round.

On December 10, 2010, Zingano faced Carina Damm at Crowbar MMA: Winter Brawl in Grand Forks, North Dakota. She defeated Damm by TKO in the second round.

Zingano next faced Takayo Hashi at Fight To Win: Outlaws on May 14, 2011. She defeated Hashi via knockout from a slam in the third round.

Invicta FC and Strikeforce
Zingano was scheduled to face Anita Rodriguez at Invicta Fighting Championships 1, but she was forced to withdraw from the card due to an injury.

Zingano had signed on to face Amanda Nunes at Strikeforce: Melendez vs. Healy on September 29, 2012, but the event was cancelled when Gilbert Melendez, who was set to defend his title against Pat Healy, sustained a knee injury in training that forced his withdrawal from the card.

Zingano instead faced Raquel Pennington at Invicta FC 3: Penne vs Sugiyama on October 6, 2012. She defeated Pennington by submission due to a rear-naked choke in the second round.

Ultimate Fighting Championship
In February 2013, it was revealed that Zingano would participate in the second women's match in Ultimate Fighting Championship (UFC) history. She fought Miesha Tate on April 13, 2013, at The Ultimate Fighter 17 Finale. Zingano defeated Tate by TKO in the third round. The bout was named Fight of the Night.

As the winner of the bout, Zingano was set to become a coach on The Ultimate Fighter 18 against Ronda Rousey and be the next challenger for the UFC Women's Bantamweight Championship. However, on May 28, it was announced that Zingano was out as coach/opponent for Rousey after she had suffered a knee injury earlier in the month which required surgery and had been replaced by Tate. On October 3, 2013, Zingano underwent PRP (Platelet-rich plasma) and stem cell treatment on both of her knees.

After nearly a year and a half away from the sport due to injury, Zingano returned to the Octagon in the fall of 2014. She faced Amanda Nunes on September 27, 2014, at UFC 178. After losing the first round, Zingano came back in the two subsequent rounds to win via TKO in the third round. After the fight she said "That whole first round, I just got my head caved in, I was dizzy; I couldn't be in light for a month. I put on like 30 pounds because my pituitary gland got knocked around and my hormones were all screwed up. I had never been hit like that in a fight.
You know, it really freaked me out because it was like, man, I am my son's only parent. If I'm all screwed up and I can't drive and I can't work and say this injury is so bad I can't fight anymore...what if I'm incapable of doing that? I can't get to the point where my brain is mush and I can barely talk, because my son's life depends on my health."

A matchup between Ronda Rousey and Zingano took place at UFC 184 for the women's bantamweight title. Zingano was quickly submitted in the fight's opening seconds.

Zingano returned to face Julianna Peña at UFC 200 on July 9, 2016. She lost the match by decision, with judges all returning 29-28 scores in favor of Peña.

Zingano faced Ketlen Vieira on March 3, 2018, at UFC 222. She lost the fight via split decision.

She then faced Marion Reneau at UFC Fight Night 133 on July 14, 2018. She won the fight by unanimous decision.

Zingano faced Megan Anderson in a featherweight fight on December 29, 2018, at UFC 232. She lost the fight in a bizarre way, via technical knock out in round one after an eye injury from an Anderson kick that didn't allow her to continue. Anderson's toe grazed Zingano's eyeball, rendering her unable to continue due to     blurred vision. Although the injury looked like it could potentially be serious, Zingano later reported that the condition of her eye was getting better. On January 14, 2019, it was revealed that Zingano appealed the loss on the grounds of Unified Rules of MMA's definition of eye gouging. CSAC upheld Anderson's win at the commission meeting on February 19, 2019.

On August 14, 2019, it was announced that Zingano had been released from the UFC.

Bellator MMA 
On October 29, 2019, it was announced that Zingano had signed with Bellator MMA.

In her promotional debut, Zingano faced Gabby Holloway at Bellator 245 on September 11, 2020. She won the fight via unanimous decision.

Zingano faced Olivia Parker on April 9, 2021 at Bellator 256. She won the bout via first round armbar submission.

Zingano was scheduled to face Pam Sorenson on March 11, 2022 at Bellator 276. However, Zingano was forced to pull out due to injury and the bout was cancelled. The bout was rebooked for Bellator 282 on June 24, 2022. She won the bout via unanimous decision.

Zingano is scheduled to face Leah McCourt on March 31, 2023 at Bellator 293.

Personal life
Zingano married Brazilian Jiu-Jitsu black belt Mauricio Zingano in 2010. Her husband committed suicide on January 13, 2014. She has a son (born 2006), making her the first mother to compete in the UFC. Ahead of her second Bellator MMA fight, she set up a scholarship fund to help students who have been recently bereaved with $10,000.

Championships and accomplishments
Ultimate Fighting Championship
 Fight of the Night (One time)
 First woman to win a UFC "Fight of the Night" award (together with Miesha Tate)
 Ring Of Fire
 ROF Women's Flyweight Champion
 ROF Women's Bantamweight Champion
 Fight To Win
 FTW Women's 125 lbs Champion
 FTW Women's 130 lbs Champion

Mixed martial arts record

|-
|Win
|align=center|13–4
|Pam Sorenson
|Decision (unanimous)
|Bellator 282
|
|align=center|3
|align=center|5:00
|Uncasville, Connecticut, United States
|
|-
|Win
|align=center|12–4
|Olivia Parker
|Submission (armbar)
|Bellator 256 
|
|align=center|1
|align=center|2:56
|Uncasville, Connecticut, United States 
|
|-
|Win
|align=center|11–4
|Gabby Holloway
|Decision (unanimous)
|Bellator 245
|
|align=center|3
|align=center|5:00
|Uncasville, Connecticut, United States
|
|-
|Loss
|align=center|10–4
|Megan Anderson
|TKO (eye injury)
|UFC 232
|
|align=center|1
|align=center|1:01
|Inglewood, California, United States
|
|-
|Win
|align=center|10–3
|Marion Reneau
|Decision (unanimous)
|UFC Fight Night: dos Santos vs. Ivanov
|
|align=center|3
|align=center|5:00
|Boise, Idaho, United States
|
|-
|Loss
|align=center|9–3
|Ketlen Vieira
|Decision (split)
|UFC 222
|
|align=center|3
|align=center|5:00
|Las Vegas, Nevada, United States
|
|-
|Loss
|align=center|9–2
|Julianna Peña
|Decision (unanimous)
|UFC 200
|
|align=center|3
|align=center|5:00
|Las Vegas, Nevada, United States
|
|-
|Loss
|align=center|9–1
|Ronda Rousey
|Submission (straight armbar)
|UFC 184
|
|align=center|1
|align=center|0:14
|Los Angeles, California, United States
|
|-
| Win
|align=center| 9–0
|Amanda Nunes
| TKO (elbows and punches)
| UFC 178
| 
|align=center| 3
|align=center| 1:21
| Las Vegas, Nevada, United States
|
|-
| Win
|align=center| 8–0
| Miesha Tate
| TKO (knees and elbow)
| The Ultimate Fighter: Team Jones vs. Team Sonnen Finale
| 
|align=center| 3
|align=center| 2:55
| Las Vegas, Nevada, United States
|
|-
| Win
|align=center| 7–0
| Raquel Pennington
| Submission (rear-naked choke)
| Invicta FC 3: Penne vs Sugiyama
| 
|align=center| 2
|align=center| 3:32
| Kansas City, Kansas, United States
|
|-
| Win
|align=center| 6–0
| Takayo Hashi
| KO (slam)
| Fight To Win: Outlaws
| 
|align=center| 3
|align=center| 4:42
| Denver, Colorado, United States
| 
|-
| Win
|align=center| 5–0
| Carina Damm
| TKO (punches and elbows)
| Crowbar MMA: Winter Brawl
| 
|align=center| 2
|align=center| 3:37
| Grand Forks, North Dakota, United States
|
|-
| Win
|align=center| 4–0
| Ivana Coleman
| TKO (punches)
| Ring Of Fire 38: Ascension
| 
|align=center| 1
|align=center| 1:54
| Broomfield, Colorado, United States
| 
|-
| Win
|align=center| 3–0
| Barb Honchak
| Decision (unanimous)
| Fight To Win: Phenoms
| 
|align=center| 3
|align=center| 5:00
| Denver, Colorado, United States
| 
|-
| Win
|align=center| 2–0
| Angela Samaro
| Submission (anaconda choke)
| Ring Of Fire 33: Adrenaline
| 
|align=center| 2
|align=center| 3:40
| Broomfield, Colorado, United States
| 
|-
| Win
|align=center| 1–0
| Karina Taylor
| Submission (armbar)
| Ring Of Fire 32: Respect
| 
|align=center| 1
|align=center| 2:30
| Broomfield, Colorado, United States
| 

|-
| Win
|align=center| 3–1
| Krystal Macatol
| Submission (armbar)
| Battlequest 8
| 
|align=center| 1
|align=center| 0:51
| Denver, Colorado, United States
|
|-
| Loss
|align=center| 2–1
| Louise Johnson
| TKO (punches)
| Kickdown Classic 45: Season's Beatings 2
| 
|align=center| 3
|align=center| 2:24
| Lakewood, Colorado, United States
|
|-
| Win
|align=center| 2–0
| Colette Elaine Garcia
| TKO (punches)
| Ring Of Fire 31: Undisputed
| 
|align=center| 3
|align=center| 0:45
| Broomfield, Colorado, United States
| 
|-
| Win
|align=center| 1–0
| Ann Wyborny
| TKO (punches)
| Premier Championship Fighting 1: HellRazor
| 
|align=center| 1
|align=center| 1:43
| Denver, Colorado, United States
|

See also
 List of current Bellator fighters 
 List of female mixed martial artists

References

External links
 
 

1982 births
Living people
American female mixed martial artists
Mixed martial artists from Colorado
Bantamweight mixed martial artists
Mixed martial artists utilizing collegiate wrestling
Mixed martial artists utilizing Brazilian jiu-jitsu
American female sport wrestlers
Amateur wrestlers
American practitioners of Brazilian jiu-jitsu
Female Brazilian jiu-jitsu practitioners
Ultimate Fighting Championship female fighters
21st-century American women